Mário João Sousa Alves (born 6 June 1935), known as Mário João, is a retired Portuguese footballer who played as a right or left back.

He appeared in 166 Primeira Liga matches during ten seasons, scoring 11 goals.

Club career
Born in Barreiro, Setúbal District, Mário João started and finished his 14-year senior career with G.D. CUF, beginning as a forward. In between, he spent seven years with S.L. Benfica in the Primeira Liga, appearing in 89 competitive matches and winning six major titles, including both of the European Cup finals in the early 60's, against FC Barcelona and Real Madrid.

Mário João retired in 1968, aged 33. He was never a full-time professional footballer, earning the vast majority of his wages from the Companhia União Fabril.

International career
Mário João won three caps for Portugal, in four years. His first arrived on 22 May 1960, in a 1–5 away defeat against with Yugoslavia for the 1960 European Nations' Cup qualifiers.

Honours
Benfica
Primeira Liga: 1959–60, 1960–61
Taça de Portugal: 1958–59, 1961–62
European Cup: 1960–61, 1961–62

References

External links
 
 

1935 births
Living people
Sportspeople from Barreiro, Portugal
Portuguese footballers
Association football defenders
Primeira Liga players
G.D. Fabril players
S.L. Benfica footballers
Portugal international footballers
Portuguese football managers
UEFA Champions League winning players